Sara del Barrio Aragón (born 10 April 1987) is a Spanish former tennis player.

Del Barrio Aragón has a career-high singles ranking by the Women's Tennis Association (WTA) of 309, achieved on 11 August 2008. She also has a career-high WTA doubles ranking of 278, achieved on 10 August 2009. Del Barrio Aragón won five singles titles and one doubles title on the ITF Women's Circuit in her career.

She made her WTA Tour main-draw debut at the 2009 Copa Colsanitas in the doubles event, partnering Estrella Cabeza Candela.

ITF finals

Singles (5–0)

Doubles (1–5)

Notes

External links
 
 

1987 births
Living people
Spanish female tennis players
21st-century Spanish women